Joaquín Nogueras (8 December 1906 – 6 April 1991) was a Spanish equestrian. He competed at the 1948 Summer Olympics, the 1952 Summer Olympics and the 1956 Summer Olympics.

References

1906 births
1991 deaths
Spanish male equestrians
Olympic equestrians of Spain
Equestrians at the 1948 Summer Olympics
Equestrians at the 1952 Summer Olympics
Equestrians at the 1956 Summer Olympics
People from Úbeda
Sportspeople from the Province of Jaén (Spain)